The Light of Day metaphorically refers to daylight.

The Light of Day or Light of Day may also refer to:

 Light of Day, a 1987 film starring Michael J. Fox and Joan Jett
 "Light of Day" (song), the title song from the film, written by Bruce Springsteen
 The Light of Day (Eric Ambler novel), a 1962 novel by Eric Ambler
 The Light of Day (Graham Swift novel), a 2003 novel by Graham Swift
 "The Light of Day", a song by Jakszyk, Fripp and Collins, from their only album, A Scarcity of Miracles

See also
The Light of Days, a nonfiction book by Judy Batalion
 The Light of Other Days, a 2000 science fiction novel by Arthur C. Clarke and Stephen Baxter
 "The Harsh Light of Day" (Buffy episode), a 1999 episode of the television show Buffy the Vampire Slayer
 Light of Dawn, a 2014 album by Unisonic